Computer chemistry can refer to:

 Computational chemistry
 Mathematical chemistry
 Chemoinformatics
 Computer & Chemistry (journal)